Indra is a given name which occurs independently in Latvia, where it is feminine, and in India and Nepal, where it can be masculine or, less often, feminine. In Latvia, the associated name day is February 1.

Notable people named Indra 

Indra III ( 9th century), Rashtrakutan king
Indra IV ( 9th century), Rashtrakutan king
Indra, Crown Princess of Nepal (1926-1950), Nepalese princess
Indra (born 1967), Swedish singer
Indra Sahdan Daud (born 1979), Singaporean footballer
Indra Devi (1899-2002), born Eugenie Peterson, Latvian yogini
Indra Gunawan (1947-2009), Indonesian badminton player
Indra Gunawan (born 1982), Indonesian footballer
Indra Gunawan (born 1988), Indonesian swimmer
Indra Joshi, British physician
Indra Putra Mahayuddin (born 1981), Malaysian footballer
Indra Nooyi (born 1955), Indian-American businesswoman
Indra Bahadur Rai (1927-2018), Indian author
Agus Indra Udayana, Indonesian social worker
Indra Wijaya (born 1974), Indonesian badminton player
Indra (1875-1915), pen name of Armenian writer Diran Chrakian
Indra Wijaya Ibrahim, Singaporean drug addict and killer

Fictional characters
Indra Chaudhari, the protagonist of Axiom Verge 2

References 

Feminine given names
Latvian feminine given names
Indian unisex given names